Maathorneferure was an ancient Egyptian queen, the Great Royal Wife of Ramesses II.

Family
Maathorneferure was a daughter of the Hittite king Hattusili III and his wife, Queen Puduhepa. She was the sister of the crown prince Nerikkaili of Hatti and the sister of the later Hittite king Tudhaliya IV.

Maathorneferure was married to the Egyptian Pharaoh Ramesses II in the 34th year of his reign, becoming the King's Great Wife. Her original name is unknown, but her Egyptian name translates as "One who sees Horus, the invisible splendor of Ra".

Life

Egypt and the Hittite empire had been increasingly at odds since the demise of the kingdom of the Mitanni, and Maathorneferure's marriage to the Egyptian king was the conclusion of the peace process  which had begun with the signing of a peace treaty thirteen years earlier.

On the Marriage Stela it is claimed that "The daughter of the great chief of Kheta marched in [front] of the army [...]" 

The Hittite princess left Hattusa, the Hittite capital, in late 1246 BCE, accompanied by her mother and a huge contingent laden with gold, silver, bronze, cattle and sheep, and slaves. At the Egyptian frontier, a message was despatched to the Pharaoh: 'They have traversed sheer mountains and treacherous passes to reach Your Majesty's border.' Ramesses sent a welcoming party to escort the princess through Canaan and into Egypt. She arrived in February 1245 BCE at Pi-Ramesse.

For Ramesses, the marriage was valuable more for the large dowry he acquired rather than his new bride, who was despatched to his harem palace at Mer-wer (today's Gurob).  According to another account, however, Maathorneferure is said to have given Ramesses a baby (a girl called Neferure, according to the Abydos procession) and died shortly thereafter.

Maathorneferure is mentioned on a papyrus found at Gurob. The partial text on the papyrus states: [...] small bag, the king's wife Maathorneferure (may she live) (the daughter of) the great ruler of Khatti, [...] Dayt garment of 28 cubits, 4 palms, breadth 4 cubits, [bag?] of 14 cubits, 2 palms, breath 4 cubits - 2 items [...] palms, breath 4 cubits.

At Tanis, there is a broken statue of Ramesses that shows her (mostly destroyed) figure touching his leg, together with her cartouche.

During the latter half of the first millennium BCE Maathorneferure's marriage to the pharaoh gave rise to the tale inscribed on the Bentresh stela in which the sister of a foreign queen is healed by a divine statue sent from Egypt.

Alternative spellings
 Maat-hor-neferure
 Maatnefrure
 Maat-hor-nefrure
 Naptera

References
 "Marriage Stela" in Ancient Records of Egypt by J. H. Breasted, Part Three, §415ff
 "The Bentresh Stela" in Ancient Egyptian Literature by M. Lichtheim, Vol.3, pp. 90ff.
 Ramesside Inscriptions by Kenneth Anderson Kitchen
 Letters of the Great Kings of the Ancient Near East: The Royal Correspondence of the Late Bronze Age by Trevor R. Bryce, p. 117ff.
 The Kingdom Of The Hittites by Trevor Robert Bryce, p. 283

Notes

External links
 Faience plaque bearing the name of Queen Maathorneferure
 The Marriage Stela of Ramses II

13th-century BC Egyptian women
Wives of Ramesses II
Hittite women
Ancient princesses